Shaws Point Township (T10N R6W) is located in Macoupin County, Illinois, United States. As of the 2010 census, its population was 532 and it contained 233 housing units.

Geography

Demographics

Adjacent townships
 Nilwood Township (north)
 Zanesville Township, Montgomery County (east)
 North Litchfield Township, Montgomery County (southeast)
 Honey Point Township (south)
 Brushy Mound Township (southwest)
 Carlinville Township (west)
 South Otter Township (northwest)

References

External links
US Census
City-data.com
Illinois State Archives

Townships in Macoupin County, Illinois
Townships in Illinois